The 2009 Chicago Red Stars season was the first season of the soccer club, and it competed in the first season of Women's Professional Soccer league.

Major events

Team news
The Chicago Red Stars team was one of the eight teams in the Women's Professional Soccer (WPS) League, the former top level professional women's soccer league in the United States that began play on March 29, 2009. The WPS was the highest level in the United States soccer pyramid for the women's game. During the WPS, the Chicago Red Stars played at Toyota Park in Bridgeview, IL - a suburb of Chicago.

Squad

First-team squad
As of March 25, 2009.

Club

Management

Competitions

Women's Professional Soccer

Standings

WPS regular season

The Chicago Red Stars' WPS regular season kicked off on 4 April and it concluded on 5 August.

Squad statistics

Statistics accurate as of 5 August 2009.

Other information

References

American soccer clubs 2009 season
2009
2009 Women's Professional Soccer season
2009 in sports in Illinois